Jay Gatsby (originally named James Gatz) is the titular fictional character of F. Scott Fitzgerald's 1925 novel The Great Gatsby. The character is an enigmatic nouveau riche millionaire who lives in a luxurious mansion on Long Island where he often hosts extravagant parties and who allegedly gained his vast fortune by illicit bootlegging during prohibition in the United States. Fitzgerald based many details about the fictional character on Max Gerlach, a mysterious neighbor and World War I veteran whom the author met while living in New York City during the raucous Jazz Age. Like Gatsby, Gerlach threw lavish parties, never wore the same shirt twice, used the phrase "old sport", claimed to be educated at Oxford University, and fostered myths about himself, including that he was a relation of the German Kaiser.

The character of Jay Gatsby has been analyzed by scholars for many decades and has given rise to a number of critical interpretations. Scholars have posited that Gatsby functions as a cipher because of his obscure origins, his unclear religio-ethnic identity and his indeterminate class status. Accordingly, Gatsby's socio-economic ascent is deemed a threat by other characters in the novel not only due to his status as nouveau riche, but because he is perceived as a societal outsider. The character's biographical details indicate his family are recent immigrants which precludes Gatsby from the status of an Old Stock American. As the embodiment of "latest America", Gatsby's rise triggers status anxieties typical of the 1920s era, involving xenophobia and anti-immigrant sentiment.

Nearly a century after the novel's publication in April 1925, Gatsby has become a cultural touchstone in American culture and is often evoked in popular media in the context of the American dream—the belief that every individual, regardless of their origins, may seek and achieve their desired goals, "be they political, monetary, or social. It is the literary expression of the concept of America: The land of opportunity". Gatsby has been described by literary scholars as a false prophet of the American dream as pursuing the dream often results in dissatisfaction for those who chase it, owing to its unattainability.

The character has appeared in various media related to the novel, including stage plays, radio shows, video games, and feature films. Canadian-American actor James Rennie originated the role of Gatsby on the stage when he headlined the 1926 Broadway adaptation of Fitzgerald's novel at the Ambassador Theatre in New York City. He repeated the role for 112 performances. That same year, screen actor Warner Baxter played the role in the lost 1926 silent film adaptation. During the subsequent decades, the role has been played by many actors including Alan Ladd, Kirk Douglas, Robert Ryan, Robert Redford, Leonardo DiCaprio, and others.

Character biography 

Born circa 1890 to impoverished Lutheran farmers in rural North Dakota, James Gatz was a poor Midwesterner who briefly attended St. Olaf College, a small Lutheran institution in southern Minnesota. He dropped out after two weeks as he disliked supporting himself by working as a lowly janitor. 

In 1907, a 17-year-old Gatz traveled to Lake Superior, where he met copper tycoon Dan Cody whose yacht Tuolomee was anchored in Little Girl Bay. Introducing himself as Jay Gatsby, the ragged young man saved Cody's yacht from destruction by warning him of weather hazards. In gratitude, Cody invited him to join his yachting trip. Now known as Gatsby, he served as Cody's protégé over the next five years and voyaged around the world. When Cody died in 1912, he left Gatsby $25,000 in his will, but Cody's mistress Ella Kaye cheated Gatsby out of the inheritance.

In 1917, after the United States' entrance into World War I, Gatsby enlisted as a doughboy in the American Expeditionary Forces. During infantry training at Camp Taylor near Louisville, Kentucky, 27-year-old Gatsby met and fell deeply in love with 18-year-old debutante Daisy Fay. Dispatched to Europe, Gatsby attained the rank of Major in the U.S. 16th Infantry Regiment and garnered decorations for extraordinary valor during the Meuse–Argonne offensive in 1918.

After the Allied Powers signed an armistice with Imperial Germany, Gatsby resided in the United Kingdom in 1919 where he briefly attended Trinity College, Oxford. While there, he received a letter from Daisy, informing him that she had married Thomas "Tom" Buchanan, a wealthy Chicago businessman. Gatsby hurriedly departed the United Kingdom and traveled across the Atlantic Ocean to Louisville, but Daisy had already departed the city on her honeymoon. Undaunted by Daisy's marriage to Tom, Gatsby decided to become a man of wealth and influence in order to win Daisy's affections.

With dreams of amassing immense wealth, a penniless Gatsby settled in New York City as it underwent the birth pangs of the Jazz Age. It is speculated—but never confirmed—that Gatsby took advantage of the newly enacted National Prohibition Act by making a fortune via bootlegging and built connections with organized crime figures such as Meyer Wolfsheim, a Jewish gambler who purportedly fixed the World Series in 1919.

In 1922, Gatsby purchased an estate on Long Island in the nouveau riche area of West Egg, a town on the opposite side of Manhasset Bay from "old money" East Egg, where Daisy, Tom, and their three-year-old daughter Pammy lived. At his mansion, Gatsby hosted elaborate soirées with hot jazz music in an attempt to attract Daisy as a guest. With the help of Daisy's cousin and bond salesman Nick Carraway, Gatsby succeeded in seducing her.

Soon after, Gatsby accompanied Daisy and her husband to Midtown Manhattan in New York City in the company of Carraway and Daisy's friend Jordan Baker. Tom borrowed Gatsby's yellow Rolls-Royce to drive into the city. He detoured to a filling station in the "valley of ashes", a sprawling refuse dump on Long Island. The impoverished proprietor, George Wilson, voiced his concern that his wife Myrtle was having an affair with another man—unaware that Tom was the individual in question.

At a hotel suite in the twenty-story Plaza Hotel, Tom confronted Gatsby over his ongoing affair with his wife in the presence of Daisy, Carraway, and Baker. Gatsby urged Daisy to disavow her love for Tom and to declare that she had only married Tom for his money. Daisy asserted that she loved both Tom and Gatsby. Leaving the hotel, Daisy departed with Gatsby in his yellow Rolls-Royce while Tom departed in his car with Baker and Carraway.

While driving Gatsby's car on the return trip to East Egg, Daisy struck and killed—either intentionally or unintentionally—her husband's mistress Myrtle standing in the highway. At Daisy's house in East Egg, Gatsby assured Daisy he would take the blame if they were caught. The next day, Tom informed George that it was Gatsby's car that killed Myrtle. Visiting Gatsby's mansion, George killed Gatsby with a revolver while he was relaxing in his swimming pool and then committed suicide by shooting himself with the revolver.

Despite the many flappers and sheiks who frequented Gatsby's lavish parties on a weekly basis, only one reveler referred to as "Owl-Eyes" attended Gatsby's funeral. Also present at the funeral were bond salesman Nick Carraway and Gatsby's father Henry C. Gatz, who stated his pride in his son's achievement as a self-made millionaire.

Creation and conception 

After the publication and commercial success of his debut novel This Side of Paradise in 1920, F. Scott Fitzgerald and his wife Zelda Sayre relocated to a wealthy enclave on Long Island near New York City. Despite enjoying the exclusive Long Island milieu, Fitzgerald disapproved of the extravagant parties, and the wealthy persons he encountered often disappointed him. While striving to emulate the rich, he found their privileged lifestyle to be morally disquieting, and he felt repulsed by their careless indifference to less wealthy persons. Like Gatsby, Fitzgerald admired the rich, but he nonetheless harbored a deep resentment towards them. This recurrent theme is ascribable to Fitzgerald's life experiences in which he was "a poor boy in a rich town; a poor boy in a rich boy's school; a poor boy in a rich man's club at Princeton." He "sensed a corruption in the rich and mistrusted their might." Consequently, he became a vocal critic of America's leisure class and his works satirized their lives.

While living in a small cottage on Long Island in 1922, writer F. Scott Fitzgerald's enigmatic neighbor was Max Gerlach. Purportedly born in America to a German immigrant family, Gerlach had been an officer in the American Expeditionary Forces during World War I, and he later became a gentleman bootlegger who lived like a millionaire in New York. Flaunting his new wealth, Gerlach threw lavish parties, never wore the same shirt twice, used the phrase "old sport", claimed to be educated at Oxford University, and fostered myths about himself, including that he was a relation of the German Kaiser. These details about Gerlach inspired Fitzgerald in his creation of Jay Gatsby. With the end of prohibition and the onset of the Great Depression, Gerlach lost his immense wealth. Living in reduced circumstances, he attempted suicide by shooting himself in the head in 1939. Blinded after his suicide attempt, he lived as a helpless invalid for many years before dying on October 18, 1958, at Bellevue Hospital, New York City. He was buried in a pine casket at Long Island National Cemetery.

Mirroring Gerlach's background, Fitzgerald's fictional creation of James Gatz has a Germanic surname, and the character's father adheres to Lutheranism. These biographical details indicate Gatsby's family are recent German immigrants. Such origins preclude them from the status of Old Stock Americans. Consequently, scholars have posited that Gatsby's socio-economic ascent is deemed a threat not only due to his status as nouveau riche, but because he is perceived as an ethnic and societal outsider. Tom Buchanan's hostility towards Gatsby, who is the embodiment of "latest America", has been interpreted as partly embodying status anxieties typical of the 1920s era, involving anti-immigrant sentiment. Accordingly, Gatsby—whom Tom belittles as "Mr. Nobody from Nowhere"—functions as a cipher because of his obscure origins, his unclear religio-ethnic identity and his indeterminate class status.

Due to Gatsby's nouveau riche background and indeterminate class status, Fitzgerald viewed the character to be a contemporary Trimalchio, the crude upstart in Petronius's Satyricon, and even refers to Gatsby as Trimalchio once in the novel. Unlike Gatsby's spectacular parties, Trimalchio participated in the orgies he hosted, although the characters are otherwise similar. Intent on emphasizing the connection to Trimalchio, Fitzgerald entitled an earlier draft of the novel as Trimalchio in West Egg. Fitzgerald's editor, Maxwell Perkins, convinced the author to abandon his original title of Trimalchio in West Egg in favor of The Great Gatsby.

Following The Great Gatsbys publication in April 1925, Fitzgerald was dismayed that many literary critics misunderstood the novel, and he resented the fact that they failed to perceive the many parallels between the author's own life and his fictional character of Jay Gatsby; in particular, that both created a mythical version of themselves and attempted to live up to this legend.

Gatsby as a reference point 

The character of Jay Gatsby has become a cultural touchstone in American culture and is often invoked in popular discourse in the context of rags-to-riches grandeur. Political commentator Chris Matthews views the character as personifying the eternal American striver, albeit one is keenly aware that his nouveau riche status is a detriment: "Gatsby needed more than money: he needed to be someone who had always had it.... this blind faith that he can retrofit his very existence to Daisy's specifications is the heart and soul of The Great Gatsby. It's the classic story of the fresh start, the second chance". However, in contrast to Gatsby as "the eternal American striver", folklorist Richard Dorson sees Gatsby as a radically different American archetype who rejects the traditional approach to earning wealth via hard work in favor of quick riches via bootlegging. In Dorson's view, Gatsby "has explicitly rejected the Protestant ethic in favor of a much more extravagant form of ambition".

The character is frequently evoked as an indicator of social mobility; in particular, the likelihood of the average American amassing wealth and achieving the American dream. In 1970, scholar Roger L. Pearson traced the literary origins of this dream to Colonial America. The dream is the belief that every individual, regardless of their origins, may seek and achieve their desired goals, "be they political, monetary, or social. It is the literary expression of the concept of America: The land of opportunity". Pearson suggests Gatsby serves as a false prophet of the American dream, and pursuing the dream only results in dissatisfaction for those who chase it, owing to its unattainability. In this context, the green light emanating across the Long Island Sound from Gatsby's house is interpreted as a symbol of Gatsby's unrealizable goal to win Daisy and, consequently, to achieve the American dream. Reporting in 2009 on the economic effects of the Great Recession on Long Island—the fictional setting of Gatsby's mansion—The Wall Street Journal quoted a struggling hotelier as saying "Jay Gatsby is dead".

The term "Gatsby" is also often used in the United States to refer to real-life figures who have reinvented themselves; in particular, wealthy individuals whose rise to prominence involved an element of deception or self-mythologizing. In a 1986 exposé on disgraced journalist R. Foster Winans who engaged in insider trading with stockbroker Peter Brant, the Seattle Post Intelligencer described Brant as "Winan's Gatsby". Brant had changed his name from Bornstein and said he was "a man who turned his back on his heritage and his family because he felt that being recognized as Jewish would be a detriment to his career".

In more recent years, Gatsby's voracious pursuit of wealth has been referenced by scholars as exemplifying the perils of environmental destruction in pursuit of self-interest. According to scholars, Gatsby's quest for greater status manifests as self-centered, anthropocentric resource acquisition. Inspired by the predatory mining practices of his fictional mentor Dan Cody, Gatsby participates in extensive deforestation amid World War I and then undertakes bootlegging activities reliant upon exploiting South American agriculture. Gatsby conveniently ignores the wasteful devastation of the valley of ashes to pursue a consumerist lifestyle and exacerbates the wealth gap that became increasingly salient in 1920s America. For these reasons, scholars argue that—while Gatsby's socioeconomic ascent and self-transformation depend upon these very factors—each one is nonetheless partially responsible for the ongoing ecological crisis.

Musical leitmotif 

Both the character of Jay Gatsby and Fitzgerald's novel have been linked to composer George Gershwin's 1924 song Rhapsody in Blue. As early as 1927, writer F. Scott Fitzgerald opined that Rhapsody in Blue idealized the youthful zeitgeist of the Jazz Age. In subsequent decades, both the latter era and Fitzgerald's literary works were often linked by critics and scholars with Gershwin's composition. In 1941, historian Peter Quennell opined that Fitzgerald's novel The Great Gatsby embodied "the sadness and the remote jauntiness of a Gershwin tune". 

Accordingly, Rhapsody in Blue was used as a dramatic leitmotif for the character of Jay Gatsby in the 2013 film The Great Gatsby, the fourth cinematic adaptation of Fitzgerald's 1925 novel. Various writers such as the American playwright and critic Terry Teachout have likened Gershwin himself to the character of Gatsby due to his attempt to transcend his lower-class background, his abrupt meteoric success, and his early death while in his thirties.

Portrayals

Stage 
The first individual to portray the role of Jay Gatsby was 37-year-old James Rennie, a stage actor who headlined the 1926 Broadway adaptation of Fitzgerald's novel at the Ambassador Theatre in New York City. As "a handsome Canadian with a good voice", Rennie's portrayal of Gatsby was met with rave reviews from theater critics. He repeated the role for 112 performances and then paused when he had to voyage to England due to an ailing family member. After returning from England, he continued to appear as Gatsby when the stage play embarked upon a successful nation-wide tour. As Fitzgerald was vacationing in Europe at the time, he never saw the 1926 Broadway play, but his agent Harold Ober sent him telegrams which quoted the many positive reviews of the production.

Film 
A number of actors later portrayed Jay Gatsby in cinematic adaptations of Fitzgerald's novel. Warner Baxter played the role in the lost 1926 silent film. Although the film received mixed reviews, Warner Baxter's portrayal of Gatsby was praised by several critics, although other critics found his acting to be overshadowed by Lois Wilson as Daisy. Purportedly, F. Scott Fitzgerald and his wife Zelda Sayre loathed the 1926 film adaptation of his novel and stormed out midway through a viewing of the film at a cinema. "We saw The Great Gatsby at the movies," Zelda wrote to an acquaintance in 1926, "it's rotten and awful and terrible and we left".

Nearly a decade after Fitzgerald's death by a heart attack in 1940, Gatsby was portrayed by Oklahoma actor Alan Ladd in the 1949 film adaptation. Ladd's Gatsby was criticized by Bosley Crowther of The New York Times who felt that Ladd was overly solemn in the title role and gave the impression of "a patient and saturnine fellow who is plagued by a desperate love". The film's producer Richard Maibaum claimed that he cast Ladd as Gatsby based on the actor's rags-to-riches similarity to the character: 

In 1974, Robert Redford portrayed Gatsby in a film adaptation that year. Film critic Roger Ebert of the Chicago Sun-Times believed that Redford was "too substantial, too assured, even too handsome" as Gatsby and would have been better suited in the role of antagonist Tom Buchanan. Likewise, film critic Gene Siskel of the Chicago Tribune criticized Redford's interpretation of Gatsby as merely a "shallow pretty boy". Siskel declared there was little resemblance between Redford's suave portrayal and the ambitious parvenu in the novel.

In more recent decades, Leonardo DiCaprio played the role in director Baz Luhrmann's 2013 film adaptation. In a 2011 interview with Time magazine prior to the film's production, DiCaprio explained he was attracted to the role of Gatsby due to the idea of portraying "a man who came from absolutely nothing, who created himself solely from his own imagination. Gatsby's one of those iconic characters because he can be interpreted in so many ways: a hopeless romantic, a completely obsessed wacko or a dangerous gangster intent on clinging to wealth".

Television 

The character of Jay Gatsby has appeared many times in television adaptations. The first was in May 1955 as an NBC episode for Robert Montgomery Presents starring Robert Montgomery as Gatsby. In May 1958, CBS filmed the novel as an episode of Playhouse 90, also titled The Great Gatsby, which starred 50-year-old Robert Ryan as the 32-year-old Jay Gatsby. 

Toby Stephens later portrayed the character in a 2000 television film adaptation. In a 2001 review of the television film, The New York Times criticized Stephens' performance as "so rough around the edges, so patently an up-from-the-street poseur that no one could fall for his stories for a second" and his "blunt performance turns Gatsby's entrancing smile into a suspicious smirk".

In The Simpsons episode "The Great Phatsby", Mr. Burns assumes Jay Gatsby's role, with the storyline spoofing the 2013 film adaptation. In the Family Guy episode "High School English", Brian Griffin is portrayed as Gatsby.

Radio 
Kirk Douglas starred as Gatsby in an adaptation broadcast on CBS Family Hour of Stars on January 1, 1950, and Andrew Scott played Gatsby in the 2012 two-part BBC Radio 4 Classic Serial production.

List

See also 
 Gatsby (sandwich), a South African submarine sandwich named after the character
 Great Gatsby curve, a measure of economic inequality and social mobility
 Adaptations and portrayals of F. Scott Fitzgerald

References

Notes

Citations

Works cited 

 
 
 
 
 
 
 
 
 
 
 
 
 
 
 
 
 
 
 
 
 
 
 
 
 
 
 
 
 
 
 
 
 
 
 
 
 
 
 
 
 
 
 
 
 
 
 
 
 
 
 
 
 
 
 
 
 
 
 
 
 
 
 
 
 
 
 
 
 
 

Characters in American novels of the 20th century
Male characters in literature
Drama film characters
Fictional businesspeople
Fictional characters based on real people
Fictional characters from New York (state)
Fictional characters from North Dakota
Fictional majors
Fictional murdered people
Fictional socialites
Fictional United States Army personnel
Fictional University of Oxford people
Fictional white-collar criminals
Fictional World War I veterans
Literary characters introduced in 1925
The Great Gatsby
Fictional janitors
Fictional German American people
Male characters in film
Fictional people from the 19th-century
Fictional people from the 20th-century